A number of politicians, public figures, newspapers and magazines, businesses and other organisations endorsed either the United Kingdom remaining in the EU or the United Kingdom leaving the EU during the 2016 United Kingdom European Union membership referendum.

Remain

Government

Territories voting in referendum
 Government of the United Kingdom
 Scottish Government
 Welsh Government
 Government of Gibraltar

Other Crown dependencies
 Government of Jersey
 Government of Guernsey

Non-UK governments
 Government of Ireland
 Government of Canada
 Government of Indonesia
 Government of Japan
 Government of South Korea

Registered political parties
Parties organised in more than one of the Home Nations:
 Green Party of England and Wales
 Labour Party
 Left Unity
 Liberal Democrats

Parties in Scotland:
 Scottish National Party (SNP)
 Scottish Green Party
 Scottish Socialist Party

Parties in Northern Ireland:
 Alliance Party of Northern Ireland
 Green Party in Northern Ireland
 NI21
 Sinn Féin
 Social Democratic and Labour Party (SDLP)
 Ulster Unionist Party (UUP)

Parties in Wales:
 Plaid Cymru

Parties in Gibraltar:
 Gibraltar Social Democrats
 Gibraltar Socialist Labour Party
 Liberal Party of Gibraltar

Other regional parties:
 Mebyon Kernow

Business leaders

Letter to The Times
In a letter published in The Times, a wide range of business leaders, including 36 FTSE 100 companies, called for a vote to stay in the European Union. The letter stated that British "business needs unrestricted access to the European market of 500 million people to continue to grow, invest, and create jobs. We believe that leaving the EU would deter investment, threaten jobs, and put the economy at risk. Britain will be stronger, safer, and better off remaining a member of the EU".

Politicians
Only politicians who held positions that differed from the party line or whose party was officially neutral are listed here.

Conservative Party
Within the Conservative Party (which was officially neutral), 25 of the 30 Cabinet Ministers including the Prime Minister, specifically: 

Others included former Prime Minister John Major, former party leader William Hague, former Deputy Prime Minister Michael Heseltine, David Willetts, former Chancellor of the Exchequer Ken Clarke, and former ministers Edwina Currie and Baroness Warsi (who, it was alleged, supported Leave, despite the Vote Leave side not being aware of her support prior to the allegations).

The majority of the Conservative Party's 330 MPs announced that they would campaign for Britain to remain in the European Union. Including Cabinet Ministers, the list included:

The list of Conservative Members of the European Parliament (MEPs) that announced that they would campaign for Britain to remain in the European Union is:

Other Conservatives supporting a Remain vote were:
 Stephen Greenhalgh, the Deputy London Mayor until May 2016.
 Stanley Johnson, former Conservative MEP and environmentalist, the father of Vote Leave Campaigner Boris Johnson
 Chris Patten, former Chairman of the Conservative Party
 Ruth Davidson, Leader of the Scottish Conservative Party

Scottish Conservative MSPs also included Miles Briggs, Peter Chapman, Jackson Carlaw, John Lamont, Alex Johnstone, Rachael Hamilton, Liz Smith, Donald Cameron, Adam Tomkins, Douglas Ross, Brian Whittle, Finlay Carson and Annie Wells.

Independent
 Sylvia Hermon (MP for North Down);
 Jeffrey Evans, 4th Baron Mountevans, Lord Mayor of London.

International figures

From other European Union member states

Other countries

International organisations 
 European Central Bank
 Group of Seven (G7) 
 G-20 major economies
 World Trade Organization (WTO) 
 World Bank 
 International Monetary Fund
 North Atlantic Treaty Organization (NATO)
 Organisation for Economic Co-operation and Development
 World Wide Fund for Nature (WWF)
 Unite the Union (British and Irish)

Businesses

Newspapers and magazines

British newspapers and magazines

Foreign newspapers and magazines
 Algemeen Dagblad (Netherlands)
 Der Spiegel (Germany)
 Il Sole 24 Ore (Italy)
 Irish Independent (Ireland)
 Le Soir (Belgium)

Local government authorities
 Birmingham City Council (Labour controlled)
 Bristol City Council (Labour controlled)
 Camden London Borough Council (Labour controlled) 
 Cardiff City Council (Labour controlled)
 City of London Corporation (Independent control)
 Glasgow City Council (Labour controlled)
 Leeds City Council (Labour controlled)
 Leicester City Council (Labour controlled)
 Liverpool City Council (Labour controlled)
 London Assembly (No overall control)
 Manchester City Council (Labour controlled)
 Milton Keynes Council (No overall control)
 Newcastle City Council (Labour controlled)
 Nottingham City Council (Labour controlled)
 Redbridge London Borough Council (Labour controlled)
 Sheffield City Council (Labour controlled)

Organisations

Trade unions
The Trades Union Congress (TUC), representing 52 British trade unions, endorsed Britain remaining in the EU. All but a few of its member unions were expected to urge voters to stay in the EU.

Other organisations

Noted individuals

Healthcare professionals letter
In a letter to The Times, around 200 healthcare professionals defended the EU as an overall benefit to UK public health, the NHS and health research. Sections from the letter stated "As health professionals and researchers we write to highlight the valuable benefits of continued EU membership to the NHS, medical innovation and UK public health". "We have made enormous progress over decades in international health research, health services innovation and public health. Much has been built around shared policies and capacity across the EU". "EU trade deals will not privatise the NHS as the EU negotiating position now contains clear safeguards. Decisions on NHS privatisation are in UK government hands alone. EU immigration is a net benefit to our NHS in terms of finances, staffing and exchanges". "Finally, leaving the EU would not provide a financial windfall for the NHS". Signatories included:

Royal Society letter

Led by Professor Stephen Hawking, more than 150 notable academics, all Fellows of the Royal Society, signed a letter to The Times newspaper setting out their position on the European Union that leaving the bloc would damage science and research. They included:

University leaders letter

Over 100 UK university leaders signed an open letter to The Sunday Times supporting UK membership of the EU. They stated that "Inside the EU, we are better able to collaborate with partners from across Europe to carry out cutting edge research, from medical and healthcare advances, to new materials, products and services. In the EU, the UK is also a more attractive destination for global talent, ensuring that our students are taught by the best minds from across Europe. This has a direct impact on our economy, driving growth, generating jobs and ultimately improving people's lives". Signatories included:

Creative Industries letter
Almost 300 of the world's biggest creative industries names signed a letter to support keeping Britain in the EU, including (but not limited to) the names listed below. A Creative Industries Federation survey also revealed that 96% of its members supported remaining in the EU. The letter stated that "Britain is not just stronger in Europe, it is more imaginative and more creative, and our global creative success would be severely weakened by walking away". Signatories included:

Economists' letter 
In a letter to The Times, 279 economists stated that Brexit would "entail significant long-term costs". The signatories wrote, "focusing entirely on the economics, we consider that it would be a major mistake for the UK to leave the European Union." At the time of publication the letter had 199 signatories. A further 80 signed after publication.

Lawyers' report 
Around 300 lawyers signed a report on UK membership of the EU and the alternatives. They stated: "we recognised how much of the debate on the UK's membership of the EU is based on a lack of information, misconceptions, or, worse, misinformation [...] Ultimately, we believe a sensible judgment on EU membership can be made only on the basis of reliable evidence". The signatories "consider that the UK's interests are best served by remaining in the EU".

Historians letter 
In a letter to the Guardian, more than 300 prominent historians urged the United Kingdom to remain in the European Union. The letter said, "On 23 June, we face a choice: to cast ourselves adrift, condemning ourselves to irrelevance and Europe to division and weakness; or to reaffirm our commitment to the EU and stiffen the cohesion of our continent in a dangerous world." Notable signatories included:

Armed Forces and Security Services
 Sir Jonathan Evans, former Director General of MI5
 Eliza Manningham-Buller, former Director General of MI5
 Sir John Sawers, former Chief of the Secret Intelligence Service (MI6)
 Sir Hugh Orde, former president of the Association of Chief Police Officers, and former Chief Constable of the Police Service of Northern Ireland
 Lynne Owens, Director-General of the National Crime Agency
 General Lord Dannatt, former Chief of the General Staff
 General Sir Rupert Smith, former Deputy Supreme Allied Commander Europe
 Lieutenant General Sir John Kiszeley, former Deputy Supreme Allied Commander Europe
 Admiral Sir Mark Stanhope, former First Sea Lord
 Lord Stirrup, Marshal of the Royal Air Force, former Chief of Defence Staff
 Robert Wainwright, director of Europol
 Lieutenant-General Sir Richard Shirreff, former Deputy Supreme Allied Commander of NATO
 Peter Carington, 6th Baron Carrington, former Secretary General of NATO
 Field Marshal Edwin Bramall, Baron Bramall, former Chief of Defence Staff, British Army
 Admiral of the Fleet Michael Boyce, Baron Boyce, former Chief of Defence Staff, Royal Navy
 General Sir Mike Jackson, former Chief of the General Staff, British Army.
 Lieutenant General Sir Rob Fry, former Deputy Chief of Defence Staff, Royal Marines
 Jonathan Shaw, Major-General, British Army.

Letters to The Guardian by European writers
On 4 June 2016, The Guardian newspaper published a number of 'letters to Britain' by European (non-British) writers and intellectuals giving their opinion on the referendum and Britain's place in Europe. All of the letters expressed support for remain. The writers were:
 Elena Ferrante, Italian
 Javier Marías, Spanish
 Timur Vermes, German
 Anne Enright, Irish
 Yanis Varoufakis, Greek
 Riad Sattouf, French
 Jonas Jonasson, Swedish 
 Kapka Kassabova, Bulgarian
 Slavoj Žižek, Slovenian

Nobel Prize laureates letter
On 10 June 2016, The Daily Telegraph published a letter signed by 13 winners of the Nobel Prize expressing the view that being part of the EU is good for British science and that is good for Britain.
 Dr Sydney Brenner, Laureate, Physiology or Medicine 2002
 Sir Martin Evans, Laureate, Physiology or Medicine 2007
 Sir Andre Geim, Laureate, Physics 2010
 Sir John Gurdon, Laureate, Physiology or Medicine 2012
 Professor Peter Higgs, Laureate, Physics 2013
 Sir Tim Hunt, Laureate, Physiology or Medicine 2001
 Dr Tomas Lindahl, Laureate, Chemistry 2015
 Sir Kostya Novoselov, Laureate, Physics 2010
 Sir Paul Nurse, Laureate, Physiology or Medicine 2001
 Professor John O'Keefe, Laureate, Physiology or Medicine 2014
 Sir Richard Roberts, Laureate, Physiology or Medicine 1993
 Sir John Sulston, Laureate, Physiology or Medicine 2002
 Sir John Walker, Laureate, Chemistry 1997

Nobel Prize in Economics laureates letter
On 19 June 2016, The Guardian published a letter signed by 10 winners of the Nobel Memorial Prize in Economic Sciences, expressing the view that the "economic argument" was clearly in favour of continued UK membership within the EU.
 George Akerlof, Laureate, 2001
 Kenneth Arrow, Laureate, 1972
 Angus Deaton, Laureate, 2015
 Peter Diamond, Laureate, 2010
 James Heckman, Laureate, 2000
 Eric Maskin, Laureate, 2007
 Sir James Mirrlees, Laureate, 1996
 Christopher A. Pissarides, Laureate, 2010
 Robert Solow, Laureate, 1987
 Jean Tirole, Laureate, 2014

Leave

Registered political parties
Parties organised in more than one of the Home Nations:
 British Democratic Party
 Britain First
 British National Party (BNP)
 Liberal Party
 Independence from Europe
 Liberty GB
 New Communist Party of Britain
Libertarian Party (UK)
Communist Party of Great Britain (Marxist–Leninist)
 Respect Party
Revolutionary Communist Party of Britain (Marxist–Leninist)
 Socialist Labour Party
 Trade Unionist and Socialist Coalition
 UK Independence Party (UKIP)
 The Justice & Anti-Corruption Party
Workers Revolutionary Party

Parties in England:

 English Democrats

Parties in Scotland:

 Scottish Democratic Alliance
 Scottish Libertarian Party
 Solidarity

Parties in Northern Ireland:

 Democratic Unionist Party (DUP)
 Traditional Unionist Voice (TUV)
 People Before Profit
 Éirígí
Irish Republican Socialist Party
Workers' Party

Business leaders

Politicians
Only politicians who hold positions that differ from the party line or whose party is officially neutral are listed here.

Conservative Party 
Within the Conservative Party (which was officially neutral): Five Cabinet members:

At the time the referendum was called, the Secretary of State for Work and Pensions was Iain Duncan Smith, who also supports leave. He subsequently resigned following the 2016 United Kingdom budget. Some suspected his resignation was due to his support for British withdrawal from the EU, but Duncan Smith has denied this, stating that such allegations were a "deliberate attempt to discredit" him.

As well as these ministers, the former Mayor of London Boris Johnson; the Conservative candidate for the 2016 mayoral election, Zac Goldsmith; former leader Michael Howard, former Defence Secretary Liam Fox and the leader of the Welsh Conservative Party Andrew RT Davies campaigned to leave. The party campaign to exit the EU is "Conservatives for Britain" which is headed by two former Chancellors of the Exchequer, Lord Lawson (Nigel Lawson) and Lord Lamont (Norman Lamont).

Many other Conservative MPs announced that they would campaign for Britain to vote to Leave:

 Conservatives MEPs include Daniel Hannan, Andrew Lewer, Emma McClarkin, Amjad Bashir, David Campbell-Bannerman and Syed Kamall
 Conservative peers include Lords Trimble (David Trimble), Tebbit (Norman Tebbit), Kalms (former Tory treasurer and former Dixons Retail chairman), The Marquess of Lothian (Michael Ancram), and Lord Framer, former treasurer, Lord Dobbs, Baron Leach and former deputy party chairman Lord Ashcroft
 The Bow Group, a Conservative think-tank, also lent its support to the Leave.EU campaign.
 Scottish Conservative MSPs include Margaret Mitchell, Graham Simpson, Alexander Stewart, Ross Thomson, Gordon Lindhurst and Oliver Mundell.
 Former Conservative MPs Esther McVey (Wirral West (2010–2015)), Louise Mensch (Corby (2010–2012)), Michael Portillo (Enfield Southgate), Ann Widdecombe (Maidstone) and Teddy Taylor (Glasgow Cathcart)

Labour Party
Within the Labour Party (which supported Remain): Labour Leave was headed by donor John Mills.

Labour MPs supporting a Leave vote:
 Ronnie Campbell (Blyth Valley)
John Cryer (Leyton and Wanstead) – frontbench member; Chair of the Parliamentary Labour Party
Frank Field (Birkenhead)
 Roger Godsiff (Birmingham Hall Green)
Kate Hoey (Vauxhall)
Kelvin Hopkins (Luton North)
John Mann (Bassetlaw)
Dennis Skinner (Bolsover)
 Graham Stringer (Blackley and Broughton)
 Gisela Stuart (Birmingham Edgbaston)

Labour MSPs:
 Elaine Smith

Former Labour MPs:
 Ian Davidson (Glasgow South West 1992–2015)
 Sir Patrick Duffy (Colne Valley 1963–1966; Sheffield Attercliffe 1970–1992)
 Bryan Gould (Southampton Test 1974–1979; Dagenham 1983–1994) - Labour leadership candidate in 1992.
 Nigel Griffiths (Edinburgh South 1987–2010)
 Tom Harris (Glasgow South 2001–2015)
 Austin Mitchell (Great Grimsby 1977–2015)
 Ronald Thomas (Bristol North West 1974–1979)

Green Party
Within the Green Party (which supported Remain): the Green Leaves organisation campaigned on behalf of Green Party members who advocated a leave vote. Member of the House of Lords and former London Assembly Member Jenny Jones (Baroness Jones) campaigned to leave.

Liberal Democrats
Within the Liberal Democrats (which supported Remain): the Liberal Leave campaign was headed by former Hereford MP, Paul Keetch.

Scottish National Party
Within the SNP (which supported Remain): former SNP deputy leader and MP Jim Sillars and former SNP leader and MP Gordon Wilson endorsed a leave vote in the referendum. Former Scottish government minister Alex Neil declared that he voted leave and that several of his fellow SNP MSPs did likewise. There were multiple groups for SNP members advocating a leave vote, such as SNP Vote Leave and SNP GO!.

Ulster Unionist Party
Within the UUP (which supported Remain): Harold McKee MLA and former leader Tom Elliott MP

Independent
 Lord Owen, currently an independent Social Democrat peer, former Labour Foreign Secretary and leader (and co-founder) of the Social Democratic Party.
 Lord Kilclooney, currently a crossbench peer, former Ulster Unionist Party MP and MEP.
 Lord Stoddart, member of the House of Lords since 1983 (formerly a Labour peer) and Independent Labour peer since 2002.

International figures

From other European Union member states

Other countries

Businesses

Newspapers and magazines

British newspapers and magazines

Foreign newspapers and magazines
 National Review, US current affairs magazine

Local government authorities
 Bromley London Borough Council (Conservative controlled)
 Havering London Borough Council (Conservative-Residents controlled) became the first council in the UK to back Brexit.
 Lincolnshire County Council (Conservative controlled)
 Portsmouth City Council (Conservative minority)
 Thanet District Council (UKIP controlled)
 Thurrock Council (UKIP – Conservative controlled)

Organisations

Trade unions
 Associated Society of Locomotive Engineers and Firemen (ASLEF)
 Bakers, Food and Allied Workers' Union (BFAWU)
 Indian Workers' Association
 National Union of Rail, Maritime and Transport Workers (RMT)
 Northern Ireland Public Service Alliance (NIPSA)

Other organisations
 Bangladesh Caterers Association UK
 Bow Group
 The Bruges Group
 Commonwealth Freedom of Movement Organisation

Noted individuals

Officially endorse neither side

Government

Other Crown dependencies
 Government of the Isle of Man

Registered political parties
 Conservative Party – allows members free choice, suspending collective ministerial responsibility.
 Official Monster Raving Loony Party – supports a vote on "In", "Out" or "Shake it all about".
 Socialist Equality Party – supports an electoral boycott.
 Women's Equality Party – non-partisan on the issue, argues that EU gains on women's rights should not be lost if Britain withdraws.

Businesses
 Lloyds Banking Group
 Morrisons
 Sainsbury's
 Tesco
 South West Trains

Newspapers and magazines
 i
 Yorkshire Post

International figures
 Ted Cruz, US Senator and 2016 Republican presidential candidate
 Gary Johnson, 2016 Libertarian Party presidential candidate
 Vladimir Putin, President of Russia
 Paul Ryan, Former Speaker of the US House of Representatives

Organisations
 38 Degrees – supports giving clear information about the referendum and the European Union
 Church of England
Open Europe, think tank advocating liberal, market-orientated and decentralising reforms within the European Union
 Patricia Scotland, Baroness Scotland, Commonwealth Secretary-General, stated Commonwealth had no unified position on Britain should stay or go, but that the idea to replace the EU with the Commonwealth is a false choice.

References

2016 in Gibraltar
2016 in the United Kingdom
2016 United Kingdom European Union membership referendum
European Union membership referendum, 2016